Dharampur is one of the 68 assembly constituencies of Himachal Pradesh, a state in northern India. It is also part of Hamirpur, Himachal Pradesh Lok Sabha constituency.

Members of Legislative Assembly & Member of Territorial Council 
 Sant Ram Thakur from Indian National Congress was The Member of Territorial Council 1957 & 1962.

Election candidate

2022

Election results

2017

See also
 List of constituencies of the Himachal Pradesh Legislative Assembly

References

External links
 

Mandi district
Assembly constituencies of Himachal Pradesh